Roxana Tomasa Díaz Sánchez (born May 17, 1981 in Melena del Sur, Havana) is a female track and field sprinter from Cuba.

Career
Her personal best in the women's 200 metres is 22.68, achieved on July 4, 2007 at a meet in Salamanca. Díaz is a two-time Olympian (2004 and 2008).

Personal best
Outdoor
100 m: 11.31 s A (wind: +1.5 m/s) –  Guatemala City, 11 May 2002
200 m: 22.68 s (wind: +0.7 m/s) –  Salamanca, 4 July 2007
400 m: 52.09 s –  Alcalá de Henares, 12 July 2008

Indoor
60 m: 7.30 s –  Athens, 6 March 2003

Achievements

References

sports-reference

External links
Tilastopaja biography

1981 births
Living people
Cuban female sprinters
Athletes (track and field) at the 2003 Pan American Games
Athletes (track and field) at the 2007 Pan American Games
Athletes (track and field) at the 2011 Pan American Games
Athletes (track and field) at the 2004 Summer Olympics
Athletes (track and field) at the 2008 Summer Olympics
Olympic athletes of Cuba
People from Mayabeque Province
Pan American Games medalists in athletics (track and field)
Pan American Games gold medalists for Cuba
Pan American Games silver medalists for Cuba
Pan American Games bronze medalists for Cuba
Central American and Caribbean Games gold medalists for Cuba
Competitors at the 2006 Central American and Caribbean Games
Central American and Caribbean Games medalists in athletics
Medalists at the 2003 Pan American Games
Medalists at the 2007 Pan American Games
Olympic female sprinters
21st-century Cuban women